Stephen Carney (22 September 1957 – 6 May 2013) was an English professional footballer who played in the Football League as a defender for Newcastle United, Carlisle United, Darlington, Rochdale and Hartlepool United.

Carney joined Newcastle United in October 1979 from Blyth Spartans for a £1,000 fee, made his debut on 1 December in a 2–0 win against Fulham in the Second Division, and left the club in 1985 for £20.000. transfer to Darlington.

He died in 2013, aged 55, of pancreatic cancer.

References

External links
 

1957 births
2013 deaths
Sportspeople from Wallsend
Footballers from Tyne and Wear
English footballers
Association football central defenders
Blyth Spartans A.F.C. players
Newcastle United F.C. players
Carlisle United F.C. players
Darlington F.C. players
Rochdale A.F.C. players
Hartlepool United F.C. players
Tow Law Town F.C. players
English Football League players
Deaths from cancer in England
Deaths from pancreatic cancer